Muna Thapa Magar is a Nepali folk singer from Manakamana-9, Gorkha. She was born in the village Siling Lamchhapa, Manakamana Village Development Committee, Gorkha district.

Career

She was brought up in Siling, Lamachap Manakamana Gorkha. Her debut was in Tanahu Aabukhaireni where she went on stage to fill the gap for her friend who could not sing because of a throat problem.

After the Nepal earthquake of April 2015, she contributed relief materials to victims.

Albums

 Teej Git – Beshiko Mela (तिज गीत – बेशिको मेला)
 Chhori (छोरी)
 Doshro Chhori (दोश्रो छोरी)
 Timi Ramro Hasole (तिमी राम्रो हांसोले)
 Badulki Lairahane (Panche Baja) (बाडुल्कि लाईरहने)
 Timi Mero Ma Timro Hune Kahile Ho (तिमी मेरो म तिम्रो हुने कहिले हो)
 Chari Basyo Barako Dalima (चरी बस्यो बरको डालीमा)
 Ke Diu Maile Samjhana (के दिउ मैले सम्झना)
 Piratima Fail (पिरतीमा फेल)
 Jiban Adhuro (जिबन अधुरो)

Awards

References

5. Nepali Lok Dohori and Muna Thapa Magar's journey so far.

External links 
 

Living people
Year of birth missing (living people)
Nepalese folk singers
21st-century Nepalese women singers
People from Gorkha District
Dohori singers